William H. Skaggs (September 16, 1861 – January 19, 1947) was a political figure in Alabama.  

Among Skaggs' publications were: 
The Southern Oligarchy: An Appeal in Behalf of the Silent Masses of Our Country Against the �Despotic Rule of the Few., discussed by Robert E Park in American Journal of Sociology,
German Conspiracies in America; From an American Point of View. By an American.  London: Unwin, (1915).  OCLC 253091747 
Skaggs also edited *America and the War in Europe: a Symposium. 1915 OCLC 70771729

References

External links
 

Mayors of places in Alabama
1861 births
1947 deaths